This article provides a list of polytechnics in Nigeria, as well as agricultural colleges and other tertiary educational institutes that provide practical training.
It does not include universities or teachers' training institutions.

The polytechnics and colleges are regulated by the Nigerian Federal Ministry of Education.
Most are owned by the Federal or State governments. Some of the colleges are beginning to award degrees.
English language is the medium of instruction. The academic year is from October to September.

Institutions

See also
 List of agricultural universities and colleges
 List of universities in Nigeria

References

Polytechnics